Aija District is one of 5 districts in Aija Province, Ancash Region, Peru. Its population was 2017 as of the 2017 census.

Geography
The District of Aija is located on the western slopes of the Cordillera Negra. It borders on Recuay Province to the south and east, on Coris District, Huacllan District and Succha District to the west, and on La Merced District to the north.

Some of the highest mountains of the district are listed below:

References 

Districts of the Aija Province
Districts of the Ancash Region